A press secretary or press officer is a senior advisor who provides advice on how to deal with the news media and, using news management techniques, helps their employer to maintain a positive public image and avoid negative media coverage.

Duties and functions
They often, but not always, act as the organization's senior spokesperson. Many governments also have deputy press secretaries. A deputy press secretary is typically a mid-level political staffer who assists the press secretary and communications director with aspects of public outreach. They often write the press releases and media advisories for review by the press secretary and communications director. There are usually assistant press secretaries and press officers that support the press secretary. Press secretaries also give declarations to the media when a particular event happens or an issue arises inside an organization. They are expected, therefore, to have in-depth knowledge about the institution or organization they represent, and to be able to explain and answer questions about the organization's policies, views upon a particular issue and its official standpoint on problematic questions.

See also
 Attaché
 Chief Cabinet Secretary
 Downing Street Press Secretary
 Press service
 Spin doctor
 Spokesperson
 White House Press Secretary

External links

 
Mass media occupations
Government occupations
Political occupations
Business occupations